Professional organizing emerged as an industry in 1984 within Los Angeles. A professional organizer assists individuals and businesses to improve their organizing systems and process. 

This industry has been popularized by a number of television programs produced on the subject, beginning with Life Laundry in 2002. This was followed by other programs, such as Clean Sweep, Neat, Mission: Organization, Tidying Up with Marie Kondo and Hot Mess House.

Principles
Professional organizers achieve the goal of creating and maintaining organizational systems by teaching others the basic principles of organization.  Writer Julie Morgenstern suggests communicating these principles by using the acronym "SPACE", interpreted as: S=Sort, P=Purge, A=Assign a Home, C=Containerize and E=Equalize. The last step ("E") consists in monitoring how the new system that has been created is working, adjusting it if needed, and maintaining it.  This principle is applicable to every type of organization.

As one of their main jobs, professional organizers help clients reduce excessive clutter (paper, books, clothing, shoes, office supplies, home decor items, etc.) in the home or in the office.

Professional organizers offer a wide variety of services, from designing a functional closet, to organizing a cross-country move.  For homeowners, a professional organizer might plan and reorganize the space of a room, improve paper management, or coach in time-management, or goal-setting.  In a business setting, professional organizers work closely with their clients to increase productivity by stream-lining paper-filing, electronic organization, and employee time-management.

See also

Adjustable shelving
Bookcase
Cabinetry
Closet
Filing cabinet
Kitchen cabinet
Mobile shelving
Pantry
Personal organizer
Shelf (storage)
Small office/home office
Study (room)
Wardrobe

References

Coaching
Time management
Cabinets (furniture)
Clothing containers
Office equipment
Ordering
Organization
Professionalism

External links
New York Times article on using professional organizing services.